Bagh Mahalleh (also Romanized as Bāgh Maḩalleh) is a village in Faruj Rural District, in the Central District of Faruj County, North Khorasan Province, Iran. At the 2006 census, its population was 238, in 54 families.

References 

Populated places in Faruj County